U.S. Vigor Senigallia is an Italian association football club located in Senigallia, Marche. It currently plays in Serie D league. The club was founded in 1921.  The club plays home matches at the Goffredo Bianchelli Stadium in Senigallia.  The club colors are red and blue.

External links
 Official homepage

Football clubs in Italy
Football clubs in the Marche
Senigallia
Association football clubs established in 1921
1921 establishments in Italy